WQLZ (97.7 FM) is a radio station  broadcasting an active rock format, licensed to Petersburg, Illinois, United States. The station serves the Springfield, IL area and is currently owned by Long Nine, Inc.

History
The station began broadcasting March 17, 1987, and aired a Christian format as WLUJ. On August 10, 2001, the station's call sign was changed to WLGM. On February 12, 2002, the station's call sign was changed to WYVR. WYVR aired a modern rock format, branded "The River", "Springfield's Modern Rock". On February 17, 2007, the station's call sign was changed to WLCE, and the station adopted an adult album alternative format. The station was branded "Alice @ 97.7" "Springfield's Music Alternative".

On August 24, 2015, WLCE flipped to active rock, temporarily simulcasting 92.7 WQLZ in Taylorville, Illinois, as "Real Rock 97.7 QLZ", On September 4, WQLZ moved permanently to 97.7, and the station's call sign was changed to the current WQLZ.

Previous logos

References

External links

QLZ
Active rock radio stations in the United States
Radio stations established in 1987
1987 establishments in Illinois